Mattoon is an unincorporated community within Crittenden County, Kentucky, United States.

References

Unincorporated communities in Crittenden County, Kentucky
Unincorporated communities in Kentucky